Maya Bar-Hillel (born 1943) is a professor emeritus of psychology at the Hebrew University of Jerusalem. Known for her work on inaccuracies in human reasoning about probability, she has also studied decision theory in connection with Newcomb's paradox, investigated how gender stereotyping can block human problem-solving, and worked with Dror Bar-Natan, Gil Kalai, and Brendan McKay to debunk the Bible code.

Education and career
Bar-Hillel studied psychology with Amos Tversky at the Hebrew University, where she earned bachelor's and master's degrees in mathematics and a Ph.D. in psychology. Her 1975 doctoral dissertation, The Base-Rate Fallacy in Subjective Judgments of Probability, introduced the concept of the base rate fallacy in probabilistic reasoning. At the Hebrew University, she was the director of the Center for the Study of Rationality from 2001 to 2005.

Family
Bar-Hillel is the daughter of Israeli philosopher and linguist Yehoshua Bar-Hillel. Her daughter, Gili Bar-Hillel, is the Hebrew translator of the Harry Potter books.

Recognition
Bar-Hillel won the Rothschild Prize for Psychology in 2018, and the George Pólya Award of the Mathematical Association of America with Ruma Falk in 1984 for their joint work on probability.

References

External links

1943 births
Living people
Israeli psychologists
Israeli women psychologists
Academic staff of the Hebrew University of Jerusalem